Ranjani is an Indian name:

 Ranjani is name of a Carnatic raga.
 Shree ranjani is also a Carnatic raga.
 Ranjani, India a village, List of villages in Pathardi taluka, in Pathardi taluka, Ahmednagar district, Maharashtra State, India

 Mangalagiri Sriranjani or Sriranjani (actress) was a Telugu theater and film actress and singer.
 Ranjani-Gayatri are Carnatic concert vocalists and violinists, and sisters.
 Ranjani Shettar is an artist in Bangalore, India.
 Rajani Thiranagama was a Tamil human rights activist and feminist.
 Sriranjani, Jr. was Telugu and Tamil film actress.

Indian unisex given names